Wankdorf can mean:
Wankdorf Stadium, a football stadium in Bern, Switzerland, that existed from 1925 to 2001
Stade de Suisse, Wankdorf, the successor stadium of the above, built at the same place
Wankdorfhalle, an indoor sporting arena in Bern, Switzerland